The 1940–41 Long Island Blackbirds men's basketball team represented Long Island University during the 1940–41 NCAA men's basketball season in the United States. The head coach was Clair Bee, coaching in his tenth season with the Blackbirds. The team finished the season with a 25–2 record and was retroactively named the national champion by the Premo-Porretta Power Poll. They won the 1941 National Invitation Tournament (NIT) as well—their second NIT championship in three seasons—going 3–0 in the tournament and defeating Ohio in the championship game.

References

LIU Brooklyn Blackbirds men's basketball seasons
NCAA Division I men's basketball tournament championship seasons
National Invitation Tournament championship seasons
Long Island
Long Island
Long Island Blackbirds Men's Basketball Team
Long Island Blackbirds Men's Basketball Team